Election Law Journal: Rules, Politics, and Policy is a quarterly peer-reviewed law journal published by Mary Ann Liebert, Inc. covering legal issues related to elections and voting rights. It was established in 2002 with Daniel H. Lowenstein (UCLA School of Law) and Richard L. Hasen (Loyola Law School) as founding editors-in-chief. , the editors are Daniel P. Tokaji (Moritz College of Law) and Paul Gronke (Reed College). As of 2018, the Editor-in-Chief is David Canon, University of Wisconsin-Madison. Election Law Journal is abstracted and indexed in Westlaw and International Political Science Abstracts/Documentation Politique Internationale.

References

External links 
 

Quarterly journals
English-language journals
Mary Ann Liebert academic journals
Law and public policy journals
Publications established in 2002
Peer reviewed law journals